Dana Key (December 30, 1953June 6, 2010) was an American Christian rock guitarist, singer, and producer who was co-founder of the Christian rock group DeGarmo and Key with keyboardist Eddie DeGarmo, best friends since the first grade. Key grew up in Memphis, Tennessee, meeting DeGarmo in the 1st grade. The two grew up together in the same neighborhood.  Key was a direct descendant of Francis Scott Key, the author of The Star-Spangled Banner.

DeGarmo and Key toured the world, headlining and opening with other major Christian rock bands including Servant, Petra, Joe English, Amy Grant, Resurrection Band, Jessy Dixon, Mylon LeFevre and Broken Heart, and dc Talk (who were both an opening act and members of D&K's roadie crew). Key and Eddie DeGarmo produced the first video by contemporary Christian artists to be aired on MTV. Key released two solo albums as well.

In 1989, Key co-authored the book Don't Stop the Music, described in the cover notes as "a defense of contemporary Christian music written by one of its premier performers."

Following retirement, Key served as the head of Ardent Records, and hosted a TV show, featuring new, younger, Christian bands. Key had been serving as the pastor of a small church in Cordova, Tennessee, The Love of Christ Church (tlc).

Key died due to a ruptured blood clot on Sunday, June 6, 2010 at age 56, according to CCM Magazine's website.

Discography

References

1953 births
2010 deaths
American rock guitarists
American male guitarists
American performers of Christian music
20th-century American guitarists
20th-century American male musicians